Ralph M. Hall/Rockwall Municipal Airport  is a city-owned public airport  east of the central business district of Rockwall, Texas, United States. The airport has no IATA or ICAO designation.

Facilities 
 Runway 17/35: 3,373 x 45 ft. (1,028 x 14 m), Surface: Asphalt

For the year ending 31 December 2015, the airport had 38,020 aircraft operations, an average of 104 per day: 99% general aviation and less than 1% military. 69 aircraft were then based at this airport: 91% single-engine, 4% multi-engine, 1% ultralight, 1% jet, and 1% helicopter.

Accidents and incidents 
On November 12, 2020, about 1306 central standard time (CST), a Cessna 182, N7306H, was substantially damaged when it was involved in an accident near Rockwall, Texas. The certificated private pilot and passenger sustained fatal injuries.

References

External links 
 Official Website
  at Texas DOT Airport Directory

Airports in Texas
Airports in the Dallas–Fort Worth metroplex
Transportation in Rockwall County, Texas